Charles-François Delacroix (or Lacroix; 15 April 1741 – 26 October 1805) was a French statesman who became Minister of Foreign Affairs under the Directory. The painter Eugène Delacroix was his fourth son, although doubts have been cast on his paternity.

Family

Charles-François Delacroix was born in Givry-en-Argonne on 15 April 1741.
He married Victoire Oëbène, daughter of the cabinet-maker Jean-François Oeben. 
Victoire's uncle Henri-François Riesener was a distinguished painter.
They had four children.
Charles-Henri Delacroix (9 January 1779 – 30 December 1845) became a soldier, and rose to the rank of General in the Napoleonic army.
Henriette was born in 1780.
She married the diplomat Raymond de Verninac Saint-Maur (1762–1822).
Henri was born six year later. He was killed at the Battle of Friedland on 14 June 1807. 
The youngest child was the future painter Eugène Delacroix (1798–1863).

When Eugène was born the gossip in Paris had it that Delacroix had been succeeded in his bed by the man who had succeeded him at his desk, Maurice de Talleyrand.
On 13 September 1797, the surgeon Imbert-Delonnes removed a "monstrous tumor" of twenty-eight pounds, in which were tangled "the most delecate masculine organs".
The tumor apparently would have rendered him impotent.
Whatever the truth, it seems certain that Charles was sent away to the Hague to avoid the gossip.

Career

Delacroix was secretary to Anne-Robert-Jacques Turgot, Baron de Laune (1727–1781), Minister of Finance during the reign of Louis XVI of France.
During the French Revolution (1789–1799), he became a deputy to the National Convention and voted for the death of the king.
Delacroix and Georges Danton interrogated Dumouriez, who was accused in March 1793 in Belgium dealing with the Austrians without permission of the Convention.
In 1793 Delacroix proposed to the Convention to confiscate the metal statuary at Versailles and melt it down to make cannon. 
The proposal was rejected after some debate.

Delacroix joined the Thermidorian Reaction.
He was appointed French Minister of Foreign Affairs between 3 November 1795 and 15 July 1797, when he was replaced by Talleyrand.
On 2 December 1797 he became a special envoy (ambassador) to the Batavian Republic.
In January 1798 he advised Herman Willem Daendels in his coup d'état against a group of federalists in the Dutch National Convention. In 1799, he became the first prefect in the Bouches-du-Rhône and in 1803 in the Gironde.

Delacroix died in Bordeaux on 26 October 1805.
When his wife, Victoire Oeben, died in 1814 it was found that family estate was fully mortgaged, and his attorney had been stealing from it. 
Rather than being worth 800,000 francs as thought, the estate was in debt by 175,000 francs.
A monument to Delacroix stands in the Chartreuse cemetery in Bordeaux.

References
Citations

Sources

External links
Eugène Delacroix (1798-1863): Paintings, Drawings, and Prints from North American Collections, a full text exhibition catalog from The Metropolitan Museum of Art
 https://web.archive.org/web/20080517081523/http://www.documents-anciens.com/fiche-181.html
 https://web.archive.org/web/20110716234551/http://www.recherche.fr/encyclopedie/Proc%C3%A8s_de_Georges_Danton_et_des_dantonistes
 

1741 births
1805 deaths
People from Marne (department)
Ambassadors of France to the Netherlands
French Foreign Ministers
Prefects of France
Prefects of Bouches-du-Rhône
Prefects of Gironde
Deputies to the French National Convention
People of the Patriottentijd
18th-century French diplomats